Dom Inácio do Nascimento de Morais Cardoso (20 December 1811 – 23 February 1883) was a Cardinal of the Roman Catholic Church and was Patriarch of Lisbon.

Morais Cardoso was born in Murça, Portugal, the son of Hipólito de Morais Cardoso, Captain-Major of Murça, and wife Eufémia Joaquina. He was educated at the University of Coimbra, where he was awarded a licentiate in theology.

Priesthood
He was ordained on 19 December 1835. He served as treasurer of the church of São Roque da Misericórdia as well as chaplain and confessor of King Pedro V of Portugal and was treasurer of the Royal Chapel of the Palace of Necessidades.

Episcopate
He was appointed as Bishop of Faro (or of Algarve) on 28 September 1863. He was consecrated on 14 February 1863 in Lisbon, by Cardinal Manuel Bento Rodrigues da Silva. He participated in the First Vatican Council that was called in Rome during 1869 to 1870. Morais Cardoso was promoted to the patriarchal see of Lisbon on 25 April 1871.

Cardinalate
He was created and proclaimed Cardinal-Priest of Santi Nereo e Achilleo in the consistory of 22 December 1873 by Pope Pius IX. He participated in the conclave of 1878 that elected Pope Leo XIII. He died in Lisbon in 1883.

References

1811 births
1883 deaths
19th-century Portuguese cardinals
Cardinals created by Pope Pius IX
Archbishops of Lisbon
University of Coimbra alumni
People from Murça